Thure Johansson may refer to:
Thure Johansson (athlete) (1886–?), Swedish long-distance runner who held a world best in the marathon
Thure Johansson (wrestler) (1912–1986), Swedish wrestler who won a bronze medal in the 1948 Summer Olympics
Thure G. Johansson,  father of Swedish politician Ines Uusmann and discoverer of Bocksten Man